is a city located in Gunma Prefecture, Japan. , the city had an estimated population of 57,013 in 20,367 households, and a population density of 390 persons per km². It is the location of the Tomioka Silk Mill, a UNESCO World Heritage Site.

Geography
Tomioka is located in the southwestern portion of Gunma Prefecture.

Mountains: Mount Myōgi (1103m)
Rivers: Kabura River
Lakes: Oshio Dam

Surrounding municipalities
Gunma Prefecture
 Takasaki
 Annaka
 Shimonita
Kanra

Climate
Tomioka has a Humid continental climate (Köppen Cfa) characterized by warm summers and cold winters with heavy snowfall.  The average annual temperature in Tomioka is 13.8 °C. The average annual rainfall is 1207 mm with September as the wettest month. The temperatures are highest on average in August, at around 26.1 °C, and lowest in January, at around 2.4 °C.

Demographics
Per Japanese census data, the population of Tomioka has remained relatively steady over the past 60 years.

History
Tomioka is located within traditional Kōzuke Province. During the Edo period, the area of present-day Tomioka was part of the tenryō territory under the direct control of the Tokugawa shogunate. It became Tomioka Town within Kitakanra District, Gunma Prefecture on April 1, 1889 with the creation of the modern municipalities system after the Meiji Restoration. In 1950 Kitakanra District was renamed Kanra District. On April 1, 1954, Tomioka annexed the neighboring town of Ichinomiya, and the villages of Ono, Kuroiwa, Takase, and Nukabe, and was raised to city status on November 1, 1958.  On April 1, 1960 the village of Nyuu was incorporated into Tomioka.  On March 27, 2006 Tomioka absorbed the neighboring town of Myōgi.

Government
Tomioka has a mayor-council form of government with a directly elected mayor and a unicameral city council of 18 members. Tomioka contributes one member to the Gunma Prefectural Assembly. In terms of national politics, the city is part of Gunma 5th district of the lower house of the Diet of Japan.

Economy
MannanLife, manufacturer of konnyaku jelly, is headquartered in Tomioka.

Education
Tomioka has 11 public elementary schools and six public middle schools operated by the city government, and two public high schools operated by the Gunma Prefectural Board of Education. The prefecture also operates two special education schools for the handicapped.

Transportation

Railway
 Jōshin Dentetsu - Jōshin Line
  -  -  -  -  -  -  -

Highway
  – Tomioka IC

Local attractions
  
Tomioka Silk Mill, or Tomioka Silk Factory (富岡製糸工場), built in 1872, was the first of its kind in Japan. The world-heritage brick building was designed by Paul Brunat, a French engineer. It was designated a World Heritage Site in 2014.
Nukisaki Shrine , the ichinomiya of former Kōzuke Province. During the New Year, an estimated 100,000 people visit the shrine to pray for happiness in the year ahead. This is the largest gathering of its kind in Gunma.
Gunma Safari Park was the fifth safari park built in Japan and the first built in eastern Japan. The park's approximate 1000 animals consist of around 100 species.
Tomioka Museum of Natural History houses 35 exhibits on Gunma's natural history, including about 30 dinosaur skeletons.
Nakatakase Kannonyama Site, Yayoi period settlement trace, a National Historic Site

Noted people from Tomioka
Tsuruko Haraguchi, psychologist
Masanobu Takayanagi, cinematographer
Eijirō Tōno, actor

International relations
 Albany, Western Australia, Australia, friendship city

References

External links

Official Website 

Cities in Gunma Prefecture
Tomioka, Gunma